The 2011–12 Rugby Pro D2 was the second-level French rugby union club competition, behind the Top 14, for the 2011–12 season. It ran alongside the 2011–12 Top 14 competition; both competitions are operated by the Ligue Nationale de Rugby (LNR).

Grenoble claimed the automatic promotion spot as league champions, and Mont-de-Marsan earned the second promotion spot by winning a playoff among the next four teams. Béziers and Périgueux finished in the two bottom spots, which would normally lead to automatic relegation to Fédérale 1. However, Béziers were spared the drop when Bourgoin were forcibly relegated to Fédérale 1 for financial reasons.

Teams

Competition format
The top team at the end of the regular season (after all the teams played one another twice, once at home, once away), is declared champion and earns a spot in the next Top 14 season. Teams ranked second to fifth compete in promotion playoffs, with the semifinals being played at the home ground of the higher-ranked team. The final is then played on neutral ground, and the winner earned the second ticket to the next Top 14.

The LNR uses a slightly different bonus points system from that used in most other rugby competitions. It trialled a new system in 2007–08 explicitly designed to prevent a losing team from earning more than one bonus point in a match, a system that also made it impossible for either team to earn a bonus point in a drawn match. LNR chose to continue with this system for subsequent seasons.

France's bonus point system operates as follows:

 4 points for a win.
 2 points for a draw.
 1 "bonus" point for winning while scoring at least 3 more tries than the opponent. This replaces the standard bonus point for scoring 4 tries regardless of the match result.
 1 "bonus" point for losing by 7 points (or less).

Season table

{| class="wikitable" width="450px" style="float:left; font-size:95%; margin-left:15px;"
| colspan="2"  style="text-align:center; background:#fff;" cellpadding="0" cellspacing="0"|Key to colors
|-
| style="background: #3fff00;" |     
|Champions automatically promoted to Top 14
|-
| style="background: #fde910;" |     
|Winner of playoffs between second- through fifth-place teams for the second promotion place
|-
| style="background:#ccf;"|     
|Remaining participants in promotion playoffs
|-
| style="background: #ff79B4;" |     
|Two teams relegated to Fédérale 1 – Bourgoin for financial reasons, and Périgueux as bottom finisher.
|}

Updated as of  21 May 2012

Results

Results table 
The home team is listed in the left column.

Promotion playoffs
All times CEST.

Semi-finals

Final

See also
 2011–12 Top 14 season

References

External links
  Ligue Nationale de Rugby – Official website
  Midi Olympique
  Match Attd

2011-12
Pro D2